St. Mary's County Regional Airport , also known as Captain Walter Francis Duke Regional Airport, is a public airport located in St. Mary's County, Maryland, United States, four miles (six km) northeast of the central business district of Leonardtown. It is owned and operated by the St. Mary's County Board of County Commissioners.

St. Mary's County Regional Airport has been in operation since 1969. The airport was re-dedicated as the Captain Walter Francis Duke Regional Airport in 2000. It recently reverted to its original name.

Facilities and aircraft 

For the 12-month period ending April 6, 2006, the airport had 52,618 aircraft operations, an average of 144 per day: 95% general aviation, 5% air taxi and <1% military. There are 100 aircraft based at this airport: 86% single engine, 8% multi-engine, 3% helicopters, 2% ultralight and 1% gliders.

The airport houses small aircraft such as Pipers, gliders, and Cessnas (152s, 172s, etc.). The Maryland State Police house one of their helicopters, Trooper 7, at the airport. Trooper 7 flies medevacs all over the area including to as far north as Montgomery County and even into northern Virginia.  There is also a small flying club where people can learn to fly and rent planes to fly over the Chesapeake Bay.

The St. Mary's Composite Squadron (MER-MD-089) of the Civil Air Patrol meets at the terminal building and bases their aircraft there, as well. CAP's primary missions in the community include aerial and ground search and rescue. The local squadron is about 100 members strong, including senior members and cadets.

The St. Mary's County Chamber of Commerce has its offices in the terminal building of the airport. The EAA also meets there.

Airlines and destinations 

There are currently no major airlines serving Captain Walter Francis Duke Regional Airport or St. Mary's County Regional Airport, but people can charter private flights to other places, making the airport public.

References

External links 

County airports in the United States
Airports in Maryland
Transportation buildings and structures in St. Mary's County, Maryland